Jane F. Gentleman (born 1940) is an American-Canadian statistician, the second female president (after Agnes M. Herzberg) of the Statistical Society of Canada, and the first winner of the Janet L. Norwood Award For Outstanding Achievement By A Woman In The Statistical Sciences.

Background

Jane F. Gentleman was born Jane Forer in 1940 in Washington, DC.  She is the daughter of Joseph Forer, an American attorney known for his progressive stances on segregation and political discrimination, and Florence Roberts, a public school teacher and viola player.  She received a BA in Mathematics (1962) and MS in Statistics (1965) from the University of Chicago.  In 1973, she completed a doctorate in statistics at the University of Waterloo.  Her dissertation was A Statistical Analysis of Mortality Data for Smokers and Nonsmokers, and for Males and Females.

Career

In 1962, Gentleman started her career as a statistical programmer at the University of Chicago's Economics department and School of Business.  In 1965, she conducted research as an associate member of technical staff at Bell Laboratories (AT&T) in Murray Hill, New Jersey through 1968.  In 1968, she worked for a year as a statistical programmer in the Department of Mathematics at the Imperial College in London.

From 1969 to 1984, Gentleman moved to the Department of Statistics at the University of Waterloo, where she taught statistics and became a tenured Associate Professor.  In 1982, she became a senior research statistician for Statistics Canada, which provides the national government with social and economic statistics.  In 1991, she became chief of the Health Status and Vital Statistics section and also, starting in 1996, editor-in-chief of Health Reports.  In 1997, she became assistant director of Analytic Methods through 1999.

In 1999, Gentleman moved to the National Center for Health Statistics (NCHS), part of the Centers for Disease Control and Prevention (CDC) in Hyattsville, Maryland, where she served as director of Health Interview Statistics until her retirement in 2014.

From 1983 to 1985, Gentleman served as president of the Caucus for Women in Statistics.  From 1988 to 1990, she served as vice president of the American Statistical Association.  From 1993-1995, she served as council member of the International Statistical Institute.  From 1996 to 1998, she served as president of the Statistical Society of Canada. From 2002 to 2004, she served again as vice president of the American Statistical Association.

In addition, Gentleman has served as associate editor and a section editor for The American Statistician, editorial board member and a section co-editor for The Canadian Journal of Statistics, editorial board member for Survey Methodology, and editor-in-chief of Health Reports.

Gentleman had a cross-appointment with the University of Waterloo’s Department of Computer Science (1973-1977), served as a statistical consultant for the Ontario Ministry of Labour (1979-1983), and was a visiting associate professor at Stanford University's Department of Statistics (summer 1981).

Awards

In 2002, Gentleman received the first-ever "Janet L. Norwood Award For Outstanding Achievement by a Woman in the Statistical Sciences."

 1983: Fellow of the American Statistical Association
 1990:  Member of the International Statistics Institute
 2002:  Janet L. Norwood Award
 2005: Faculty of Mathematics Alumni Achievement Medal, University of Waterloo

Personal

In 1959, Jane Forer married Bernard Munk; they had one child.  In 1967, she married W. Morven Gentleman; they had one child.

Mary E. Thompson (later, also president of the Statistical Society of Canada) has called Gentleman "a fine role model and mentor."

Works

Gentleman has written or contributed to more than 180 articles, edited a book, and contributed to five other books, as well as reviewed many works.  Selected works include:

Doctoral Thesis:
 A Statistical Analysis of Mortality Data for Smokers and Nonsmokers and for Males and Females (1973)

Books edited:
 Case Studies in Data Analysis (1994)

Books and Special Issues edited or contributed to:

 Proceedings of Computer Science and Statistics, 12th Annual Symposium on the Interface (1979)
 A Special Issue of Papers Presenting Current Statistical Work at Statistics Canada (1988)
 The Oxford Dictionary of Statistical Terms, Sixth Edition (2003)
 Statistical Journal of the International Association for Official Statistics, Volume 28, Numbers 1-2 (2012)
 Proceedings of the National Center for Health Statistics (June 25, 2007  conference commemorating the National Health Interview Survey’s 50th anniversary) (2008, 2015)

Articles written or contributed to:

 "Detecting Outliers: II. Supplementing the Direct Analysis of Residuals," Biometrics (1975)
 "The Distribution of the Frequency of Occurrence of Nucleotide Subsequences, Based on Their Overlap Capability," Biometrics (1989)
 "Estimation of the Mutagenic Potency of Environmental Chemicals Using Short-Term Bioassay. Case Study in Data Analysis, No. 8," Canadian Journal of Statistics (1993)
 (winner of 1993 Canadian Journal of Statistics Award)
 "Age Differences in Married and Divorcing Couples in Canada," Health Reports (1994)
 "Surgical Rates in Subprovincial Areas Across Canada: Rankings of 39 Procedures in Order of Variation," Canadian Journal of Surgery (1996)
 "On Judging the Significance of Differences by Examining the Overlap Between Confidence Intervals," The American Statistician (2001)
 "The National Health Interview Survey: 50 Years and Going Strong," Chance (2008)
 Editorial on Reshaping Health Statistics, Statistical Journal of the International Association for Official Statistics (2012)
 "Addressing Disclosure Concerns and Analysis Demands in a Real-Time Online Analytic System," Journal of Official Statistics (2013)

See also

 Joseph Forer
 Janet L. Norwood
 Agnes M. Herzberg
 Mary E. Thompson
 Statistical Society of Canada
 University of Waterloo 
 Statistics Canada
 National Center for Health Statistics

References

External links
 CDC: search on "Jane F. Gentleman"

Canadian statisticians
Women statisticians
University of Chicago alumni
University of Waterloo alumni
Fellows of the American Statistical Association
Presidents of the Statistical Society of Canada
1940 births
Living people